The Bacchus Lady (The Killer Woman) is a 2016 South Korean drama film directed and written by E J-yong. It was shown in the Panorama section at the 66th Berlin International Film Festival as well as the Seattle International Film Festival. The director describes the film as a "bittersweet drama".

The film depicts the life of an elderly prostitute called Youn So-young, who works as a Bacchus Lady.

Synopsis 
The story of a Bacchus lady, Youn Yuh-jung, an elderly South Korean prostitute.

Cast
 Youn Yuh-jung as So-Young
 Jeon Moo-song as Jae-Woo
 Yoon Kye-sang as Do-Hoon
 Ye Soo-jung as Bok-hee
 Park Seung-tae as eyebrow tattoo woman
 An A-zu
 Choi Hyun-jun
 Joo In-young as Migration center employee	
 Kim Hye-yoon as Nurse

Awards and nominations

References

External links

2016 films
2016 drama films
South Korean drama films
2010s Korean-language films
Films about old age
Films about prostitution in South Korea
Films directed by E J-yong
2010s South Korean films